Megodon is a subgenus of the hoverfly genus Microdon. It is native to Madagascar, and contains only two known species. Microdon stuckenbergi has an unusual scutellum. Larvae are found in ant nests.

Species
There are 2 species described in Megodon:
M. planitarsus Keiser, 1971
M. stuckenbergi (Keiser, 1971)

References

Insect subgenera
Diptera of Africa
Insects of Madagascar
Endemic fauna of Madagascar